Ida Jessen (born 25 September 1964 in Sønderjylland) is a Danish author and translator who writes in both Danish and Norwegian. Jessen was nominated for the Nordic Council's Literature Prize and has won several awards for her work. She is a member of the Danish Academy and a recipient of the Lifetime Award from the Danish Arts Foundation.

Biography 
Jessen holds an M.A. in History of Literature and Communication from Aarhus University in 1990. She made her literary debut in 1989 with her first collection of short stories Under Sten (Under Stones) and has written a number of novels and short story collections for both children and adults. Jessen has translated a number of authors from Norwegian and English into Danish, including Alice Munro, Marilynne Robinson, Lars Saabye Christensen, and Karin Fossum.

Selected works
 Under Sten (1989)
Troldtinden (1994)
 Den der lyver (2001) - translated into English as The One Who's Lying (2011)
 Det første jeg tænker på (2006)
 Børnene (2009)Postkort til Annie (2013) - translated into English as Postcard to Annie (2022)
 En ny tid (2015) - translated into English as A Change of Time''

Awards
 Jytte Borberg Prize (2006)
Søren Gyldendal Prize (2009)
 De Gyldne Laurbær (2009)

References

External links
Ida Jessen at litteratursiden.dk

1964 births
Living people
Danish women novelists
20th-century Danish women writers
21st-century Danish women writers